The Nokia N91 is a smartphone produced by Nokia as part of their Nseries line of portable devices. It was announced on April 27, 2005 along with N70 and N90 as the first three Nseries devices. The N91 ran on Symbian-based S60 3rd Edition (the first to run on Symbian 9.1). It was the first ever phone encompassing a 4 GB internal hard drive, allowing storage for 3,000 songs (an 8 GB revision came later). The N91 is highly focused on music,. with dedicated music keys on the front which slide down to reveal the keypad. It also featured the industry-standard 3.5 mm headphone jack, and was anticipated as a major challenger to Apple, whose iPod dominated the industry. The design of the N91 is based on stainless steel with a matte finish.

The N91 became one of 2005's most anticipated phones, however it suffered from a long delay of release. It was expected to begin shipping by the end of 2005; but in September that year the device was delayed till 2006. In February 2006, it was delayed yet again due to software issues, pushing the release to Q2. Finally in April 2006 it was first released to consumers, a full year after announcement.

Nevertheless, N91 won the 'Most Innovative Product' and 'Most Technologically Advanced Product' award in recognition of its true multimedia music experience, added together with its high-end smartphone capabilities. In advertisements for the phone, Nokia recommended Bose and Sennheiser headphones. Its sound output is considered by many to be of very high quality and very loud.

Features
It features a 2-megapixel camera and a music player playing songs encoded in either AAC, AAC+, eAAC+, MP3, mp3PRO, WAV, MIDI, or Microsoft's WMA format. It is generally considered the benchmark in the music department, simply for its unparalleled sound quality through headphones.  It also features 3G and Wi-Fi connectivity. The phone features a 176 x 208, 262,144 colours TFT LCD display and dedicated music functionality buttons (XpressMusic) that slide down to reveal traditional mobile phone keys. Battery life when solely playing music has been estimated at 12 hours.

The N91 was not the first smartphone with a gigabyte hard drive: the Samsung SGH-i300, announced just a month before the N91, was the first. However the N91 packed in 4 GB, compared to 3 GB for the i300.

Variants

An 8GB variant or N91 8GB, internally known as N91-2, was announced on September 26, 2006. This upgraded model features some minor improvements in addition to the extra storage space. The most prominent feature on the N91-2, apart from the increased memory, was the inclusion of A2DP Bluetooth Profile. This profile enabled wireless music playback over Bluetooth, in full stereo (2 different channels, L+R). Compatible Bluetooth headsets were already available in the market by then. N91 8GB had a distinct Black color, that added to its face value. Once again breaking a record: it was the first phone with an 8GB hard disk.

N91-5 was a version of the N91 with the 4 GB memory, but without Wi-Fi (WLAN) and 3G Network support. It was produced by the Chinese plant of Nokia. This model retailed for about 50 Euros less than the regular N91.

Improvements

 8GB HDD
 A2DP profile is supported (BT Stereo audio)
 Improved Gallery (replaced old style gallery in 4GB version)
 Sound Recorder support
 UPnP support
 H264 support (QCIF 176x144)
 General stability improvements in HDD
 HDD Tools added: Scandisk and defragmentation
 WMA DRM support (although this was added to 4GB version in updated firmware)
 Visualization effects in the music player
 Distinct Black color 
 Better WLAN and Web browser

Problems and criticisms

There have been a few problems with the N91, namely connecting the phone to a Macintosh computer. This will often cause the phone to crash as the two units are disconnected and music files are often not recognised despite being loaded into the phone's hard drive. Also, in old firmware versions, when you install a new theme, it will reset itself back to the default theme. Users can update the firmware using Nokia's PC Suite.

In the Philippines, there was an incident involving an N91 being used with one of Nokia's 46 million recalled BL-5C lithium-ion batteries, and exploded as a result.

References

External links

 
 Nokia N91 Press Release
 N91 Specifications from Symbian and Nokia
 Nokia N91 at WikiSpecs

Reviews
 Camera-Phones-Spot
 All About Symbian N91 review
 InfoSync World
 N91 Reviews and specifications roundup
 Howard Chui brief Nokia N91 review
 The Smartphones Show – N91 video review
 Mobile Today – Retailer Review
 Mobile-Review 

Universal Plug and Play devices
Nokia Nseries
Slider phones
Mobile phones introduced in 2005